Hot Swing is a live swing jazz album by Mark O'Connor, Frank Vignola and Jon Burr. The trio later released two more similarly-themed albums, one live and one in the studio, under the name of "Mark O'Connor's Hot Swing Trio". These were In Full Swing and Live in New York. The album is a sort of dedication to Stéphane Grappelli, one of O'Connor's mentors and influences (Grappelli began to teach him when O'Connor was seventeen).

The album draws upon the works of Django Reinhardt and Stéphane Grappelli (and the Duke Ellington, Johnny Mercer, and Billy Strayhorn standard, "Satin Doll") in addition to original works by O'Connor and Burr.

Track listing
"Swingin' on the 'Ville" (O'Connor) – 5:11
"Nuages" (Django Reinhardt) – 5:31
"Sweet Suzanne" (O'Connor) – 6:36
"Satin Doll" (Duke Ellington, Johnny Mercer, Billy Strayhorn) – 4:48
"Minor Swing" (Stéphane Grappelli, Django Reinhardt) – 6:25
"In the Cluster Blues" (O'Connor) – 8:24
"Lament" (Jon Burr) – 5:12
"Pickles on the Elbow" (O'Connor) – 7:54

Personnel
Mark O'Connor – Violin
Frank Vignola – Guitar
Jon Burr – Bass
also
Dorothea von Haeften – Album Photography
Marty O'Connor – Additional Photography
Dennis Gaul – Recording
jbQ, Yonkers, New York – Mastering

Mark O'Connor albums
2001 live albums
2001 debut albums